Princess Isabel Maria of Braganza,  (Isabel Maria Alberta Josefa Micaela Gabriela Rafaela Francisca de Paula e de Assis Teresa Adelaide Eulália Sofia Carolina; 19 November 1894, Kleinheubach, Kingdom of Bavaria – 12 January 1970, Regensburg, Bavaria, Germany) was a member of the House of Braganza. Through her marriage to Franz Joseph, 9th Prince of Thurn and Taxis, Isabel Maria was also a member of the House of Thurn and Taxis and Princess consort of Thurn and Taxis.

Family
Isabel Maria was born in Kleinheubach, Bavaria, Germany, the eldest daughter of the Miguelist pretender to the Portuguese throne Miguel, Duke of Braganza and his second wife Princess Maria Theresa of Löwenstein-Wertheim-Rosenberg. Isabel Maria's father was the head of the non reigning branch of the Portuguese Royal House that had been exiled from Portugal. The exile was the result of the Portuguese law of banishment of 1834 and the constitution of 1838 which was brought about because his grandfather Miguel I of Portugal had in 1828 usurped the throne of Portugal from Queen Maria II. Her grandfather reigned as king until 1834 when Maria II was restored.

Marriage and issue

Isabel Maria married Franz Joseph, Hereditary Prince of Thurn and Taxis, eldest son of Albert, 8th Prince of Thurn and Taxis and his wife Archduchess Margarethe Klementine of Austria, on 23 November 1920 in Bronnbach, Wertheim am Main, Baden-Württemberg, Germany. Isabel Maria and Franz Joseph had five children:

Prince Gabriel of Thurn and Taxis (16 October 1922 – 17 December 1942)
Prince Michael of Thurn and Taxis (16 October 1922 – 17 October 1922)
Princess Helene of Thurn and Taxis (27 May 1924 – 27 October 1991) married in Regensburg (civ) 18 April 1947 (rel) 29 April 1947 (annulled 1967, div 1968) Rudolf Erwein Graf von Schönborn-Wiesentheid (1 October 1918 – 3 May 1998)
Princess Maria Theresia of Thurn and Taxis (10 September 1925 – 27 April 1997) married 19 June 1955 Franz Eduard Graf von Oppersdorff (19 June 1919 – 25 August 1985)
Princess Maria Ferdinande of Thurn and Taxis (19 December 1927 – 9 June 2018) married in Regensburg 15 July 1950 (div 1951) Prince Franz Joseph von Hohenzollern (15 March 1926 – 13 March 1996)

Ancestry

References

1894 births
1970 deaths
House of Braganza
Portuguese infantas
Hereditary Princesses of Thurn and Taxis
Dames of the Order of Saint Isabel
People from Kleinheubach
Burials at the Gruftkapelle, St. Emmeram's Abbey